The church of Saint Panteleimon of Acharnai is a Greek Orthodox basilica in the center of Athens. It has a maximum length of 63 m and width 48 m and it is the biggest church of Greece.

The foundations of the church were laid on 12 September 1910 by King George I of Greece and it was consecrated on 22 June 1930. The church's interior  paintings were created by the painter Giannis Karouzos (1937-2013). It took him 23 years to complete the painting of the 6,000 m2 surface of the interior walls of the church.

Other sources consider Cathedral of Saint Andrew, Patras, and not Church of Saint Panteleimon of Acharnai, as the largest orthodox church in Greece.

See also
The neighbourhood of Saint Panteleimon
List of largest Orthodox cathedrals

References

External links 
 
 Church of Greece

Eastern Orthodox church buildings in Athens
20th-century Eastern Orthodox church buildings
Churches completed in 1930
Church buildings with domes